Srećni ljudi is a Serbian TV series that aired from 1993 to 1996. Created by the Radio Television of Belgrade (RTB) it is the first Serbian TV show ever produced after the breakup of SFR Yugoslavia.

History
Srećni ljudi began airing on Radio Television of Belgrade on Sunday 12 September 1993, opening with the theme song named "Srećni ljudi" sung by Ekstra Nena and Boba Stefanović. It has 70 episodes, divided into 2 seasons, both having 35 episodes. The last episode aired on 30 July 1996.

Plot
The plot follows the members of Golubović family (father, mother, their son, his wife and their two children), in the time of sanctions and difficulty. Each member is confronted by their own daily struggles and everyone is looking for solutions.

Cast

Velimir Bata Živojinović - Aranđel Golubović
Radmila Savićević - Ristana Golubović
Živojin Milenković - Tijosav Marjanović "Garac"
Desimir Stanojević - Vukašin Golubović
Tanja Bošković - Lola Golubović
Zlata Numanagić - Lola Golubović
Dubravka Mijatović - Đurđina "Đina" Golubović
Jugoslava Drašković - Đurđina "Đina" Golubović
Svetislav Goncić - Časlav Marjanović "Čarli"
Janko Milivojević - Nebojša "Neca" Golubović
Nikola Simić - Mihajlo Ostojić
Danilo Lazović - Šćepan Šćekić
Vlastimir Đuza Stojiljković - Marinko Bidžić / Conte Mario Marco del Tintoretto

Change of actresses

After the 25th episode, Tanja Bošković and Dubravka Mijatović were replaced by Zlata Numanagić and Jugoslava Drašković, respectively. Both of the actresses left the series allegedly because of low wages.

See also
Radio Television of Serbia

References

External links
  at Facebook
 

Radio Television of Serbia original programming
Works by Milovan Vitezović
1993 Serbian television series debuts
1996 Serbian television series endings
Serbian comedy television series
Serbian-language television shows
1990s Serbian television series
Television shows set in Belgrade
Television shows filmed in Belgrade